The 1967–68 Spartan League season was the 50th in the history of Spartan League. The league consisted of 18 teams.

League table

The division featured 18 teams, 15 from last season and 3 new teams:
 Leighton Town, from South Midlands League
 Egham Town, from Surrey Senior League
 Chertsey Town, from Greater London League

References

1967-68
9